Use Your Voice may refer to:

Use Your Voice (Mason Jennings album), 2004
Use Your Voice (H2O album), 2015